David C. Monson (born July 30, 1950) is an American politician in the state of North Dakota. He is a member of the North Dakota House of Representatives, representing the 10th district. A Republican, he was first elected in 1992. An alumnus of North Dakota State University, he is a farmer. He is also a former Director of the Osnabrock School Board, Assistant Majority Leader of the House of Representatives, and Speaker of the House of Representatives.

References

1950 births
Republican Party members of the North Dakota House of Representatives
Living people
People from Cavalier County, North Dakota
North Dakota State University alumni
School board members in North Dakota
Speakers of the North Dakota House of Representatives
21st-century American politicians